Rob McKelvey (born August 2, 1969) is an American professional golfer who played on the Nationwide Tour.

McKelvey joined the Nike Tour (later Buy.com Tour and Nationwide Tour) in 1996. In his rookie year on Tour, he recorded three top-10 finishes with his best result coming at the Nike Dominion Open where he finished in a tie for second. From 1997 to 1999 he recorded five top-10 finishes with his best result being a tie for third. He picked up his first win on tour in 2000 at the Buy.com Louisiana Open. He continued to play on Tour until 2004.

Professional wins (2)

Buy.com Tour wins (1)

Other wins (1)
1993 Columbia, South Carolina event (NGA Hooters Tour)

External links

American male golfers
Central Alabama Trojans men's golfers
Louisiana Ragin' Cajuns men's golfers
PGA Tour golfers
Golfers from Atlanta
1969 births
Living people